Scott Anthony Seabol (born May 17, 1975 in McKeesport, Pennsylvania, United States) is a former Major League Baseball player.

He made his major league debut on April 8, with the New York Yankees, but only for a single game. After a short time in the Milwaukee Brewers farm system, he signed with the St. Louis Cardinals on May 27, 2003 and was assigned to their AAA team, the Memphis Redbirds in the Pacific Coast League. After an injury to Scott Rolen, Seabol was promoted from Memphis and played several positions with the Cardinals in a backup role, primarily third base. In , he was signed by the Florida Marlins and invited to spring training as a non-roster invitee. Seabol was assigned to the Marlins' AAA team, the Albuquerque Isotopes, in Albuquerque, New Mexico, in the Pacific Coast League. In early July, 2006, his contract was sold to the Kia Tigers of the Korean Professional Baseball League, causing him to miss the AAA All-Star game, to which he had been selected. In December , Seabol signed with the Hiroshima Toyo Carp of the Japanese Professional Baseball League for the  season. His contract was not renewed by the Carp after the 2009 season, and he became a free agent.

Scott played junior college baseball at Allegany Community College and college baseball for the West Virginia Mountaineers.  In high school, he played at South Allegheny Middle/Senior High School in Liberty Boro, Pennsylvania.  He is one of five former Trojans to make it to the major leagues.  The others are John Kruk, Joe Beimel, Stan Belinda, and Steve Kline.

He was drafted by the New York Yankees in the 88th round of the 1996 Major League Baseball draft. When he made his major league debut with the Yankees in 2001, he became the lowest drafted player ever to make it all the way to the major leagues. That record has since been broken by other players.

Trivia
In , Seabol had a 35-game hitting streak while a member of the minor league Greensboro Bats, then affiliated with the New York Yankees. It was the fourth-longest in minor league history.

References

External links

Career statistics and player information from Korea Baseball Organization

1975 births
Living people
Baseball players from Pennsylvania
Major League Baseball third basemen
Oneonta Yankees players
Greensboro Bats players
Norwich Navigators players
Columbus Clippers players
Indianapolis Indians players
Memphis Redbirds players
Albuquerque Isotopes players
St. Louis Cardinals players
New York Yankees players
West Virginia Mountaineers baseball players
American expatriate baseball players in Japan
Hiroshima Toyo Carp players
KBO League infielders
American expatriate baseball players in South Korea
Kia Tigers players